The Kolhapur day gecko (Cnemaspis kolhapurensis) is a species of gecko described from the hills in Kolhapur in Maharashtra, India.

References

K
Endemic fauna of India
Fauna of Maharashtra
Reptiles of India
Lizards of Asia
Reptiles described in 2009